Camp Ripley is a  military and civilian training facility operated by the Minnesota National Guard near the city of Little Falls in the central part of the state. The location of the camp was selected in 1929 by Ellard A. Walsh, Adjutant General of the State of Minnesota. The site's winter warfare training course is the primary facility used by the National Guard for winter combat exercises. Camp Ripley also hosts the training academy for the Minnesota State Patrol and is a popular site for athletes training to compete in winter biathlons. Most Minnesota Guard soldiers train at Camp Ripley during two-week annual training periods.

The camp is a state game refuge with resources managed cooperatively by the Department of Military Affairs and Department of Natural Resources. It also houses the Minnesota Military Museum, a museum that is open for the public and military personnel.  Also on the grounds is the site of Fort Ripley, a military post established in 1848—the second ever built in Minnesota—to keep the peace among the Dakota, Ojibwe, and Ho-Chunk people.

The Minnesota State Veterans Cemetery is also located on the grounds of Camp Ripley.

History of Camp Ripley

The site for Camp Ripley was first approved following World War I in 1929. The State of Minnesota purchased  of land to be used for military training. The site was officially named Camp Ripley in December 1930. It was named after Fort Ripley, a frontier fort that had been closed by the Federal Government in 1877. The fort was named for Brigadier General Eleazar Wheelock Ripley, a hero of the War of 1812. The remains of Fort Ripley are contained within the camp's property boundaries. The first soldiers that came to train at Camp Ripley stayed in tents, thus, training was only possible in the summer months. The government started to see that it was not beneficial to use tents year round while training, so they constructed buildings. There are now many historic buildings at Camp Ripley. An example is Valhalla, the governor's lodge. President Harry S. Truman stayed there twice, as did Senator Eugene McCarthy. When the lodge is not being used by the governor, it is used for other VIP guests.

In 1951, the Minnesota Legislature approved the purchasing of more land by Camp Ripley. After the purchase they then had  of land. Camp Ripley slowly bought more land and now has .

Camp Ripley State Training Facility
Camp Ripley is the training site for the National Guard, Minnesota State Patrol, Minnesota Wing of the Civil Air Patrol, Minnesota DNR, Minnesota State Fire Marshal (Minnesota Board of Firefighter Training and Education), and Foreign exchange programs.  The Army Reserve often trains at Camp Ripley during the summer.

National Guard training
Camp Ripley has small arms and tank ranges, maneuver training areas capable of supporting heavy brigade, and special operation training facilities. Examples of the special operation training facilities are: Three drop zones, rappel tower, confidence course, water training areas, two prisoner of war compounds, and many more.
The Miller Army Airfield is also located at the camp. Named for Ray S. Miller, it includes a 6100-foot (1860 m) paved runway capable of accommodating C-130 aircraft. There are also five drop zones for training for the release of cargo and personnel from aircraft. The airfield's FAA identifier is KRYM.
Camp Ripley has a fully equipped winter training area. It is the National Guard's premier cold weather training site in the United States. There are: Biathlon courses, groomed cross country ski paths, special cold weather equipment, down hill ski slopes and all-weather ranges.

Foreign exchange program
In addition to being used by the United States military, it sees regular visitors from Canada, the Netherlands, and Norway (exchange programme with the Norwegian Home Guard since February 1974, with a total of 3,000 Norwegians involved over the years and a similar number of Americans having gone to the Norwegian Home Guard training centre at Værnes Air Station), and the United Kingdom.

DNR, State Fire Marshal, Transportation and State Patrol training
Camp Ripley houses the Department of Natural Resources Enforcement Center. DNR Conservation Officers are trained year-round in Camp Ripley's diverse habitat. They train by practicing controlled burns and studying the habitat.

Camp Ripley hosts many State Fire training classes; including response, live fire burn exercises, apparatus driving maneuvers, and fire investigations throughout the year.

Camp Ripley hosts the Department of Transportation Snow and Ice snow plowing training each summer.

Camp Ripley has been the host for the Minnesota State Patrol Academy since 1996. The men and women who train to become state patrol officers practice their shooting skills on one of Camp Ripley's ranges and practice driving maneuvers.

Environmental sector
The environment office studies the relationship and compatibility of military activities with wildlife. They use geographic information systems (GIS) to determine training sites, figure out what areas have historic value, where eagle nests are and much more. Wildlife that is specifically studied are: bald eagle, white-tailed deer, black bear, blandings turtle and timber wolf. The Environmental office has won awards for their work at camp ripley and with the local area. The list of awards is as follows:

2008 Secretary of the Army, Environmental Security Award
"Natural Resources Conservation – Large Installation"

2005 Secretary of the Army, Environmental Security Award
"Natural Resources Conservation-team"

1998 Secretary of the Army, Environmental Security Award
"Natural Resources Conservation – Large Installation"

Annual deer hunts
There are three deer hunts each year at Camp Ripley to help control the deer population: one for disabled veterans and soon-to-be deployed Soldiers, one archery hunt for adults, and a youth archery hunt. There are raffles for the adult and youth archery hunts every year to determine who can participate in the hunt. For each weekend there are about 2,000 hunters.

Sustainability
The Unmanned Aerial Systems Operations Facility is pending LEED Silver. This was done by the use of local, recyclable materials and enhanced thermal envelope. This will be the first LEED rated building at Camp Ripley. The UASOF was designed by JLG Architects

References

External links 

Camp Ripley 
Minnesota Military Museum 

1930 establishments in Minnesota
Buildings and structures in Morrison County, Minnesota
Installations of the United States Air National Guard
Installations of the United States Army National Guard
Military facilities in Minnesota
Protected areas of Morrison County, Minnesota